Percicval Lee Speakman (5 November 1885 – 12 May 1933) was an Australian rules footballer who played with Richmond in the Victorian Football League (VFL).

Notes

External links 

1885 births
1933 deaths
Australian rules footballers from Victoria (Australia)
Australian Rules footballers: place kick exponents
Richmond Football Club players